Kalaage Handhaanuga is a 2009 Maldivian romantic film directed by Ahmed Asim. Produced by Mohamed Shamaail under Movie People, the film stars Asim and Maisha in pivotal roles. The entire film was shot in K. Thulusdhoo.

Premise
A school teacher, Shasha (Maisha) starts a romantic relationship with Zanish (Ahmed Asim) who works at a photo-copy shop. A strong-hearted local who is obsessed over her beauty is heartbroken when he discovers their relationship and tries brainstorming her by talking ill about Zanish. Everything was going smooth between the couple until they decide to marry. A pre-marriage diagnosis reveals the couple as two carriers of thalassemia trait. Despite all the barriers, Zanish and Shasha decide to marry which infuriates her father.

Cast 
 Ahmed Asim as Zanish
 Maisha as Shasha
 Ajunaz Ali as Ammadey
 Nashidha Mohamed as Leena

Soundtrack

References

Maldivian short films
2009 short films
2009 films